Caribeginella flormarina is a species of small sea snail, a marine gastropod mollusk in the family Marginellidae, the margin shells.

Description

Distribution

References

 Espinosa J. & Ortea J. (1998) Nuevo género y nueva especie de Molusco Gasterópodo maginelliforme (Mollusca: Gastropoda) con rádula taenioglossa. Avicennia 8-9: 113-116

Marginellidae
Gastropods described in 1998